The Society for Research in Adult Development (SRAD) was formed in 1981.  It held its first symposium that year at Harvard University on the 15th floor of William James Hall for one day.  It has met yearly ever since for one and a half or two days.  Its electronic mailing list has around 300 members.  Presentations, posters and discussions center on positive adult development.  For many of the early years, edited books resulted from some of the papers given at the symposium.  After 1990, with the advent of the Journal of Adult Development, many went there, especially in special issues. 2013-2016, Adult Development Bulletin has been published.

It now meets yearly in the premeeting of the Society for Research in Child Development (SRCD).  In the year that SRCD does not meet, it meets with the American Educational Research Association (AERA).

External links
 Official website
 European Society for Research in Adult Development
 Journal of Adult Development

Psychological societies